Ubiquitin-specific protease 36 is an enzyme that in humans is encoded by the USP36 gene.

This gene encodes a member of the ubiquitin-specific protease family of proteases that is a deubiquitinating enzyme (DUB) with His and Cys domains. This protein is located in the nucleoli and deubiquitinate nucleophosmin and fibrillarin

References

Further reading